The 2016 season is Home United's 21st consecutive season in the top flight of Singapore football and in the S.League. Along with the S.League, the club will also compete in the Prime League, the Singapore Cup and the Singapore League Cup.

Club

Coaching staff
{|class="wikitable"
|-
!Position
!Staff
|-
|S.League Head Coach|| Philippe Aw
|-
|S.League Assistant CoachPrime League Head Coach|| Robin Chitrakar
|-
|S.League Assistant Coach|| Steve Vilmiaire
|-
|Team Manager|| Badri Ghent
|-
|Technical Director|| Steve Vilmiaire
|-
|Technical Director|| Adlane Messelem
|-
|Goalkeeper Coach|| Adi Saleh
|-
|Head of Sports Performance|| Dirk Schauenberg
|-
|Sports Trainer|| Daisyree Anarna
|-
|Logistics Officer|| Mohd Zahir
|-
|Prime League Team Manager|| Bernard Lan
|-
|rowspan="2"|Under-17 Head Coach|| Fadzuhasny Juraimi
|-
| Syed Azmir
|-
|rowspan="2"|Under-15 Head Coach|| Syed Karim
|-
| Yahya Madon
|-

Other information

Squad information

S.League squad

Transfers

In

Out

Pre-season friendlies

Team statistics

Appearances and goals

Numbers in parentheses denote appearances as substitute.

Competitions

Overall

Overview

{| class="wikitable" style="text-align: center"
|-
!rowspan=2|Competition
!colspan=8|Record
|-
!
!
!
!
!
!
!
!
|-
| S.League

|-
| Singapore Cup

|-
| League Cup

|-
|-
! Total

S.League

League table

Matches

Singapore Cup

Preliminary round

Quarter-finals

League Cup

Group stage

References

Home United FC seasons
Home United